Rarities from the Capitol Vaults is a compilation album by Australian-American pop singer Helen Reddy that was released in 2009 by EMI Music Special Markets and boasts 10 previously unreleased songs (tracks 1-10) as well as two lesser-known recordings.



Reception

Stephen Thomas Erlewine of Allmusic writes, "The biggest surprise here is that a fair number of the unreleased songs tend to have a prominent backbeat -- usually some sort of play on disco, but 'Tell Jack' is a pretty terrific slice of Elton John-styled glam rock."

Track listing

 "I Am Woman" (alternate version) (Ray Burton, Helen Reddy) – 2:24
 from sessions for the 1971 album I Don't Know How to Love Him 
 "Me and My Love" (Bruce Roberts, Carole Bayer Sager) – 3:28
 from sessions for the 1978 album We'll Sing in the Sunshine 
 "Together" (Charles Fox, Norman Gimbel) – 3:23
 from sessions for the 1978 album We'll Sing in the Sunshine 
 "Rhythm Rhapsody" (Ralph Schuckett, John Siegler) – 4:15
 from sessions for the 1978 album We'll Sing in the Sunshine 
 "Blue" (alternate version) (Joe Raposo) – 4:34
 from sessions for the 1978 album We'll Sing in the Sunshine 
 "Tell Jack" (Phil Galdston, Peter Thorn) – 4:24
 no recording information provided 
 "Exhaustion" (Robin Sinclair) – 2:28
 from sessions for the 1979 album Reddy 
 "Don't Mess with a Woman" (alternate version) (Michael Curtis, Richard Curtis, Patty Moan) – 3:38
 from the session in which "I Am Woman" was rerecorded for single release 
 "Lullaby" (Helen Reddy, Carole Bayer Sager) – 3:02
 no recording information provided 
 "Songs" (alternate version) (Barry Mann, Cynthia Weil) – 3:11
 from sessions for the 1974 album Love Song for Jeffrey 
 "Take What You Find" (extended mix) (Julie Didier, Casey Kelly) – 5:01
 promotional-only, extended 12" disco edition 
 "Plus de Chansons Tristes (No Sad Song)" (Carole King, Toni Stern) – 3:01
 English-language version appears on the 1971 album Helen Reddy

Personnel
 Original albums
Helen Reddy – vocals
Tom Catalano – producer ("Songs")
Frank Day – producer ("Exhaustion")
Kim Fowley – producer ("Me and My Love", "Together", "Rhythm Rhapsody", "Blue")
Ron Haffkine – producer ("Take What You Find")
Larry Marks – producer ("I Am Woman", "Plus de Chansons Tristes")
Jay Senter  – producer ("Don't Mess with a Woman")
 Compilation
Kevin Flaherty – producer
Peter Borsari – photography
Gunther – photography
Douglas Kirkland – cover photo, photography
Susan Lavoie – art direction
David McEowen – mastering
Helen Reddy – track notes
Steve Silvas – design
Jordan Sommers – music consultant
mastered at Capitol Mastering Studios, Hollywood, California

Notes

2009 compilation albums
Helen Reddy albums
Albums produced by Tom Catalano